James Milton Sheldon Sr. (c. 1880 – July 7, 1965) was an American football player, coach of football and basketball, and college athletics administrator.  He served as the head football coach at Indiana University from 1905 to 1913, while also serving as assistant professor of law, compiling a record of 35–26–3.  Sheldon was also the head basketball coach at Indiana for one season, in 1906–07, tallying a mark of 9–5.  In addition, he served as Indiana's athletic director from 1907 to 1910.

Sheldon died on July 7, 1965, in LaPorte, Indiana.

Head coaching record

Football

References

1880s births
1965 deaths
19th-century players of American football
American football ends
American football halfbacks
Chicago Maroons football coaches
Chicago Maroons football players
Indiana Hoosiers athletic directors
Indiana Hoosiers football coaches
Indiana Hoosiers men's basketball coaches